Ron S. Geffner is an American attorney and former U.S. Securities and Exchange Commission enforcement lawyer. Geffner is a founding partner of Sadis & Goldberg, where he heads Financial Services Group providing legal counsel to over 800 funds including domestic and international financial institutions, family offices, hedge funds, venture capital and private equity funds. Geffner was previously in-house counsel to the Investment Management Industry Services Group of PricewaterhouseCoopers.

As a legal expert in the securities industry, Geffner regularly appears on television, radio, and various other media outlets. He has been a regular guest on Bloomberg, C-Span, Fox News, CBS Morning Show, Squawk Box, Power Lunch and Closing Bell on CNBC, BBC and CNN. Geffner is regularly quoted in The New York Times, The Wall Street Journal, Bloomberg News, Barron’s, Reuters, Dow Jones, Financial Times, Newsday, TheStreet.com, Private Equity Week and other national and international publications.

Early life
Geffner began his career with the SEC, where he investigated and prosecuted violations of the federal securities laws with an emphasis on enforcement in connection with violations of the Investment Advisers Act of 1940 and the Investment Company Act of 1940. He also assisted federal and state criminal agencies, such as the Federal Bureau of Investigation, U.S. Attorney’s Office and the Attorney General’s Office, in their investigations of criminal violations of federal and state securities laws.

Public Service, Boards, memberships and awards
Geffner is a member of the New York and New Jersey Bars. He served on the Board of the Hedge Fund Association and was previously Vice President for the international not-for-profit industry trade and nonpartisan lobbying organization devoted to advancing transparency, development and trust in alternative investments. Geffner is also founding partner and a member Sadis & Goldberg's executive committee. His law firm was twice voted "Best Global and North American Law Firm" for hedge funds.

Personal life
Geffner made a cameo appearance as a federal agent in a US documentary television series on Investigation Discovery.

Notes

External links
Ron S. Geffner, Sadis & Goldberg

Living people
American law firm executives
New York (state) lawyers
Law firm founders
Year of birth missing (living people)